KLASA FC, or simply KLASA, is a professional football club based in Keinou, Bishnupur, in the Indian state of Manipur. It was the 2022 season champion of Manipur State League, but was not granted the I-League 2 nomination.

History

Beginning
The Keinou Library and Sports Association, known as KLASA FC at the present days, was registered in 1972. The purpose of KLASA was to look for the development in the field of library and sports in Keinou and adjoining areas. One of the pioneer personalities of KLASA was Chanambam Prakash Singh, who was player of Indian Air Force. Whenever he was on leave, started conducting trainings at Keinou Kangjeibung, which is now popularly known as KLASA FC home ground. A full team was formed and after rigorous training, KLASA emerged as district champion in the consecutive years of 1976, 1977 and 1978. KLASA also claimed victories among the champions of various districts that participated and thus, the club popularity was increasing year by year.

Manipur State League
KLASA started playing in the top tier league of Manipur football from 2014, after winning several local cups. They got relegated from State League in 2015–16 season, returning the next year. After several quiet years, in 2021–22 KLASA created history by emerging as the 14th Manipur State League champion, quenching the thirst of fifty years long await for this major state level trophy.

I-League 2nd Division
After winning the Manipur State League in 2022, KLASA qualified for the I-League 2nd Division.

Honours

Domestic league
 Manipur State League
 Champions (2): 2021–22, 2022–23

Domestic cups
Shirui Lily Cup
Runners-up (1): 2022
K. Shantibala (AJSA) Football Tournament
Winners (3): 1997–98, 2003–04, 2009–10
Jiri Cup
Winners (2): 2015–16, 2017–18

See also
List of football clubs in Manipur

References

Association football clubs established in 1971
I-League 2nd Division clubs
Football clubs in Manipur
1972 establishments in India